The Moscow Regional Committee of the Communist Party of the Soviet Union, commonly referred to as the Moscow CPSU obkom, was the position of highest authority in Moscow Oblast during most of the existence of the Soviet Union. The position was created on 24 January 1929 as the Central Industrial Oblast, and abolished on 29 August 1991 although most authority was lost in June that year to the position of Governor of Moscow Oblast. The First Secretary was a de facto appointed position usually by the Politburo or the General Secretary himself.

First Secretaries
The following individuals served as first secretaries of the Moscow Regional Committee of the Communist Party of the Soviet Union.

See also
Governor of Moscow Oblast
Moscow City Committee of the Communist Party of the Soviet Union

References

Sources
 World Statesmen.org

Regional Committees of the Communist Party of the Soviet Union
Politics of Moscow Oblast
1929 establishments in the Soviet Union
1991 disestablishments in the Soviet Union